Tell Qasr Labwe is an archaeological site 1 km west of Labweh in the Beqaa Mohafazat (Governorate). It dates at least to the Neolithic and there is a Roman temple on the site.

References

Baalbek District
Neolithic settlements
Ancient Roman temples
Archaeological sites in Lebanon
Great Rift Valley